Sanzhar Tashkenbay (Sanjar Taşkenbai; born 2003) is a Kazakh amateur boxer who won gold medal at the 2021 Youth World Championships, and 2021 Youth Asian Championships, both in the light flyweight division.

References

External links

Living people
2003 births
Kazakhstani male boxers
Light-flyweight boxers
Sportspeople from Astana
21st-century Kazakhstani people